Supramontana is a genus of land planarians from South America.

Description 
The genus Supramontana is characterized by the presence of a cephalic retractor muscle not associated with cephalic glands. This muscle is similar to the one found in the genera Issoca and Luteostriata, but in Supramontana the organ lacks cephalic glands, which are present in the other two genera.

The copulatory apparatus of Supramontana has a permanent penis papilla and a long common ovovitelloduct.

Etymology 
The name Supramontana comes from the Latin words supra (on the top) and montanus (of the mountains). It is a reference to the type-locality of Supramontana irritata, the city of São Francisco de Paula, in Southern Brazil, whose previous name was São Francisco de Paula de Cima da Serra (on the top of the mountains).

Species 
There are two described species in the genus Supramontana:
Supramontana argentina Negrete et al., 2014 
Supramontana irritata  Carbayo & Leal-Zanchet, 2003

Phylogeny 
A molecular study on the phylogeny of the subfamily Geoplaninae nested the genus Supramontana inside the genus Luteostriata. The two genera formed a monophyletic clade with the genus Issoca. The clade is supported by at least one synapomorphy, the presence of a cephalic retractor muscle derived from the longitudinal cutaneous ventral musculature that anteriorly dissipates by detaching its fibers, making them open in a fan-like fashion towards the body margins.

References 

Geoplanidae
Rhabditophora genera